Texas Flood is the debut studio album by the American blues rock band Stevie Ray Vaughan and Double Trouble, released on June 13, 1983 by Epic Records. The album was named after a cover featured on the album, "Texas Flood", which was first recorded by blues singer Larry Davis in 1958. Produced by the band and recording engineer Richard Mullen, Texas Flood was recorded in the space of three days at Jackson Browne's personal recording studio in Los Angeles. Vaughan wrote six of the album's ten tracks.

Two singles, "Love Struck Baby" and "Pride and Joy", were released from the album. A music video was made for "Love Struck Baby" and received regular rotation on MTV in 1983. Texas Flood was reissued in 1999 with five bonus tracks including an interview segment, studio outtake, and three live tracks recorded on September 23, 1983 at The Palace in Hollywood, California. The album was reissued again in 2013, with two CDs in celebration of the album's 30th anniversary. Disc 1 is the original album with one bonus track, "Tin Pan Alley". Disc 2 is selections from a previously unreleased concert recorded at Ripley's Music Hall in Philadelphia, Pennsylvania on October 20, 1983, originally recorded for the King Biscuit Flower Hour radio program.

Texas Flood received positive reviews, with critics praising the deep blues sound, and Vaughan’s songwriting, while some criticized the album for straying too far from mainstream rock. A retrospective review by AllMusic awarded it five out of five stars.

Background
Vaughan and Double Trouble had performed at the Montreux Jazz Festival in July 1982 and caught the attention of musician Jackson Browne. He offered the band three days of free use in his Los Angeles recording studio. During Thanksgiving weekend, they accepted Browne's offer and recorded a demo. It was heard by record producer John H. Hammond, who had discovered artists such as Aretha Franklin, Bob Dylan, and Bruce Springsteen among many others. He presented the demo to Greg Geller, head of A&R at Epic Records, and arranged a recording contract.

Recording and production
Since the first day of production largely involved setting up equipment, Texas Flood was recorded in two days, with no overdubs. In early 1983, subsequent to the band's signing with Epic, they were given an advance of $65,000 to re-master the recordings. The album was mixed and mastered in New York City. The recordings were released as Texas Flood in June 1983.

Bassist Tommy Shannon recalls of the sessions, "It really was just a big warehouse with concrete floors and some rugs thrown down. We just found a little corner, set up in a circle looking at and listening to each other and played like a live band." Vaughan used two Fender Vibroverbs and a 150-watt Dumbleland Special owned by Browne. Engineer and co-producer Richard Mullen says of his production techniques:

Touring

Vaughan and Double Trouble toured North America and Europe in June–December 1983 to support Texas Flood. On July 15, 1983, they performed at the Rooftop Skyroom Bar in Buffalo, NY, then July 20 the El Mocambo in Toronto and a film was released in December 1999 by Sony named Live at the El Mocambo on DVD. A performance from Austin City Limits was also released on the video Live from Austin, Texas. On August 22, 1983, the band performed a sold-out concert at The Palace in Hollywood. The show was broadcast on the King Biscuit Flower Hour and three tracks were included on the reissue of Texas Flood. The tour continued on through Europe and the band appeared at the Reading Festival in England. They went back to the United States and opened 17 shows for The Moody Blues.

Reception
{{Album ratings
| state =

| rev1 = AllMusic
| rev1Score = 
| rev2 = Encyclopedia of Popular Music
| rev2Score = 
| rev3 = Entertainment Weekly
| rev3Score = B+
| rev4 = The Great Rock Discography
| rev4Score = 6/10<ref name="GRD"></ref>
| rev5 = MusicHound Blues| rev5Score = 3.5/5
| rev6 = Rolling Stone| rev6Score = 
| rev7 = The Rolling Stone Album Guide| rev7Score = 
| rev8 = The Village Voice| rev8Score = B
| rev9 = Classic Rock| rev9Score =  
|rev10 = The Penguin Guide to Blues Recordings|rev10score  = 
}}Texas Flood was released on June 13, 1983, with two singles released from the album—"Pride and Joy" and "Love Struck Baby". "Pride and Joy" peaked at #20 on the Mainstream Rock Tracks chart. "Texas Flood" was nominated for Best Traditional Blues Performance and "Rude Mood" was nominated for Best Rock Instrumental Performance. The album was mostly well received by critics. A five-star AllMusic review by Stephen Thomas Erlewine described it as a "monumental impact" and said it "sparked a revitalization of the blues". Despite many positive responses, it also received some negative notices with Rolling Stone criticizing Vaughan for a lack of originality and claiming that he didn't possess a distinctive style.Texas Monthly gave the album a positive review, calling Vaughan "the most exciting guitarist to come out of Texas since Johnny Winter". In a less enthusiastic review for The Village Voice, Robert Christgau felt that the album lacked "momentum and song form", which he averred to be the essence of rock and roll. It was the lack of these characteristics that was, he said, the reason his attention wandered "after the kickoff originals 'Love Struck Baby' and 'Pride and Joy.'" The album peaked at #38 on the Billboard 200 chart immediately after its release. It went platinum in Canada and double-platinum in the United States, selling over 2,000,000 units.

On Dec. 21st, 2020 it was announced that the album was a 2021 inductee into the Grammy Hall of Fame in recognition of its historical significance.

Track listing
Original release

Note: Many releases of the album erroneously attribute songwriting credits of "Testify" for Parliament members who have written an unrelated song of the same name.

1999 reissue bonus tracks

"SRV Speaks" is from a studio interview with Timothy White for Westwood One Radio. "Tin Pan Alley" is a studio outtake from the sessions for the album. The remaining bonus tracks are all from recordings for the Superstar Concert Series radio broadcast.

2013 reissue

Disc 2: Live at Ripley's Music Hall in Philadelphia, PA (October 20, 1983)
 "Testify" - 4:14
 "So Excited" - 4:17
 "Voodoo Child (Slight Return)" - 7:44
 "Pride and Joy" - 4:57
 "Texas Flood" - 10:00
 "Love Struck Baby" - 3:08
 "Mary Had a Little Lamb" - 2:59
 "Tin Pan Alley (aka Roughest Place in Town)" - 8:14
 "Little Wing/Third Stone from the Sun" - 12:28

Personnel
Double Trouble
 Stevie Ray Vaughan – guitar, vocals
 Tommy Shannon – bass
 Chris Layton – drums

Production
Produced by Stevie Ray Vaughan, Richard Mullen, Tommy Shannon, and Chris Layton
Executive producer – John H. Hammond
Production assistant – Mikie Harris
Engineered by Richard Mullen, assisted by James Geddes; Vocals on "I'm Cryin'" recorded by Lincoln Clapp
Mixed by Lincoln Clapp, assisted by Don Wershba and Harry Spiridakis
Mastered by Ken Robertson
Cover art by Brad Holland
Tray card photo by Don Hunstein
Art direction by John Berg and Allen Weinberg

1999 reissue
 Executive producer – Tony Martell
 Produced by Bob Irwin
 Mastered by Vic Anesini
 Track 12 mixed by Danny Kadar
 Dialogue edited by Darcy Proper
 Research assistance by George Deahl, Al Quaglieri, Matthew Kelly, and Jon Naatjes
 Art direction by Josh Cheuse
 Editorial direction by Andy Schwartz
 Liner notes by Michael Ventura

Release history

 Charts 

Certifications

Notes

References

 

External links
 Texas Flood'' at Discogs

Stevie Ray Vaughan albums
1983 debut albums
Epic Records albums
Albums produced by John Hammond (producer)
Texas blues albums